"Lick Ya Down" is the debut single released by Barbadian pop group Cover Drive. The single was released on August 28, 2011 as a digital download in the United Kingdom, taken from their debut album Bajan Style. On September 4, 2011, the song entered at number 9 on the UK Singles Chart for the week ending September 10, 2011.

Background
In an interview with Digital Spy the group were asked to describe their single, Amanda from the group said: "'Lick Ya Down' is a phrase from Barbados which contrary to popular belief in the UK is not 'naughty' - It means 'knock ya down'! We had to add in an explanation at the beginning of the video of what it means as everyone thought it was something else. There's a lot of fun, attitude and energy in there." A music video to accompany the release of "Lick Ya Down" was first released onto YouTube on 13 July 2011 at a total length of three minutes and thirty-five seconds. At the end of the music video, when the group gets in the car, their second single 'Twilight' begins to play.

Track listing

Chart performance

Release history

References

2011 debut singles
Cover Drive songs
2011 songs
Songs written by J. R. Rotem
Songs written by Marty James
Song recordings produced by J. R. Rotem